Morris Fuller Benton (November 30, 1872 – June 30, 1948) was an American typeface designer who headed the design department of the American Type Founders (ATF), for which he was the chief type designer from 1900 to 1937.

Many of Benton's designs, such as his large family of related sans-serif or "gothic" typefaces, including Alternate Gothic, Franklin Gothic, and News Gothic, are still in everyday use.

Typefaces

Benton is credited as America's most prolific designer of metal type, having (with his team) completed 221 typefaces, including revivals of historical models, like Bodoni and Cloister; original designs, such as Hobo, Bank Gothic, and Broadway; and adding new weights to existing faces, such as Century, Goudy Old Style and Cheltenham. Although he did not invent the concept, Benton working at ATF pioneered the concept of families of typeface designs, allowing consistency of appearance in different sizes, widths and weights. This allowed ATF to capitalise on a successful typeface's popularity and facilitated coherent layout and graphic design; its 1923 specimen book described its approach of creating families which could allow advertisers to "talk at command with varying emphasis and orchestral power [rather than using] a medley of display types."

Benton worked as the team leader of designers responsible for creating a basic design and then adapting it to different sizes and weights. He considered his work as a designer important and wrote a brief list of typefaces he considered his most important work in 1936, shortly before his retirement. Benton was relatively retiring in life: a 1936 interview described him as "one of the most difficult men to interview I have ever talked to...try to pin some honour on him, or give him credit for some achievement, and he will modestly sidestep with the remark that ‘Lady Luck helped me a lot there!’"

Technology
In addition to his strong aesthetic design sense, Benton was a master of the technology of his day. He read mechanical engineering at Cornell University, graduating in 1896. His father, Linn Boyd Benton, invented the pantographic engraving machine, which was capable not only of scaling a single font design pattern to a variety of sizes while compensating for the size change, but could also condense, extend, and slant the design (mathematically, these are cases of affine transformation, which is the fundamental geometric operation of most systems of digital typography today, including PostScript). Morris used these machines with his father at ATF, during which these machines were refined to an impressive level of precision.

Theo Rehak, the current owner of much ATF typecasting equipment, and author of the definitive treatise Practical Typecasting, explains that the Bentons demanded that any deviation in machining or casting be within two ten-thousandths of an inch. Most modern machine shops are equipped to measure down to one thousandth of an inch. As an advertising device, in 1922 ATF manufactured a piece of type eight points tall (0.11 inch) containing the entire Lord's Prayer in 13 lines of text, using a cutting tool roughly equivalent to a 2000-dpi printer.

References
Baines, Phil; Haslam, Andrew (2005). Type and Typography. Watson-Guptill Publications. .
Blackwell, Lewis (2004). 20th Century Type. Yale University Press: 2004. .
Cost, Patricia (2011). The Bentons: How an American Father and Son Changed the Printing Industry. Cary Graphic Arts Press. .
Fiedl, Frederich; Ott, Nicholas; Stein, Bernard Stein (1998). Typography: An Encyclopedic Survey of Type Design and Techniques Through History. Black Dog & Leventhal. .
Jaspert, W. Pincus; Berry, W. Turner; Johnson, A. F. (1953, 1983). The Encyclopedia of Type Faces. Blandford Press. .
 MacGrew, Mac (1993). American Metal Typefaces of the Twentieth Century. New Castle, Delaware: Oak Knoll Books. .
Macmillan, Neil (2006). An A–Z of Type Designers. Yale University Press. .
Meggs, Phillip B. (2002). Revival of the Fittest. RC Publications. .
Rollins, Carl Purlington. “American Type Designers and Their Work.” Print, vol. 4, no. 1.

External links
 Morris Benton blog, related to the 2011 book The Bentons: How an American Father and Son Changed the Printing Industry, by Patricia Cost
 Linn Boyd Benton, Morris Fuller Benton, and Typemaking at ATF (PDF)
 Morris Fuller Benton history, by Cynthia Jacquette
Morris Fuller Benton
HPLHS Font collection, a set of vintage fonts released by the H. P. Lovecraft Historical Society, including several by Benton
 Type Design Information Page, collection of samples of Benton's work, by Luc Devroye

1872 births
1948 deaths
American typographers and type designers
Artists from Milwaukee
Engineers from Wisconsin
Cornell University College of Engineering alumni
20th-century American engineers